Damien Samuel Allen (born 1 August 1986) is a former English footballer who is currently academy manager at Stockport County

Damien progressed through the Centre of Excellence youth system at Stockport County after being released by Manchester United at the age of 14 and made his mark in centre midfield. He made his debut for Stockport in a 2–0 defeat at Wrexham in 2004–05.

After a spell on loan at Royal Antwerp, Allen joined Morecambe in August 2007. After a season at the club Allen was released by manager Sammy McIlroy.

He signed for non league F.C. Halifax Town on 7 October 2008.

Allen signed a 12-month contract with Bury on 29 July 2009 following a successful trial period with the club.

After not making any league appearances for Bury, he was released at the end of the season. On 28 July 2010, Allen signed for Welsh club Colwyn Bay managed by former Bury player Dave Challinor.
On 28 November 2011, Allen signed for the then Welsh Premier League champions, Bangor City.

After 7 years at Bangor City, Allen signed for rivals Aberystwyth Town in January 2018.

During summer 2020 Allen was announced as the Academy Manager at his first club Stockport County.

References

External links
 Bangor City profile
 

1986 births
Living people
People from Cheadle, Greater Manchester
English footballers
Association football midfielders
Stockport County F.C. players
Royal Antwerp F.C. players
Morecambe F.C. players
English Football League players
Expatriate footballers in Belgium
Colwyn Bay F.C. players
Bangor City F.C. players
Cymru Premier players
Bury F.C. players
FC Halifax Town players
Aberystwyth Town F.C. players
Newtown A.F.C. players
Stockport County F.C. non-playing staff
Denbigh Town F.C. players